Oregon Jack Provincial Park is a provincial park in British Columbia, Canada located in the Clear Range west of Ashcroft.  It protects the limestone canyon of Oregon Jack Creek, at the head of which is a waterfall named the Notch, above which is included a wetland area.  The site was an important First Nations site and there are pictographs, culturally modified trees and a site known as the Three Sisters Rock Shelter.

See also
Blue Earth Lake Provincial Park
Cornwall Hills Provincial Park

References

BC Parks infopage

Provincial parks of British Columbia
Thompson Country
Canyons and gorges of British Columbia
Nlaka'pamux
Waterfalls of British Columbia
1996 establishments in British Columbia
Protected areas established in 1996